Bruno Carini (17 November 1912 – 15 August 1945) was a French racing cyclist. He rode in the 1937 Tour de France.

References

1912 births
1945 deaths
French male cyclists
Place of birth missing